Mongalla may refer to:

 Mongala, one of the 21 provinces of the Democratic Republic of the Congo
 Mongala District, an administrative region of the Democratic Republic of Congo
 Mongalla, South Sudan, a community in South Sudan
 Mongalla Game Reserve, a nearby game reserve in South Sudan
 Mongalla Gazelle, a species of gazelle found in the floodplain and savanna of eastern South Sudan 
 Mongalla Free-tailed Bat, a bat found in dry and wet savannah regions of Africa